Virgilio Frias is a Dominican Republic boxer. He competed in the men's heavyweight event at the 1984 Summer Olympics.

References

Year of birth missing (living people)
Living people
Dominican Republic male boxers
Olympic boxers of the Dominican Republic
Boxers at the 1984 Summer Olympics
Boxers at the 1983 Pan American Games
Pan American Games bronze medalists for the Dominican Republic
Pan American Games medalists in boxing
Central American and Caribbean Games bronze medalists for the Dominican Republic
Competitors at the 1986 Central American and Caribbean Games
Place of birth missing (living people)
Heavyweight boxers
Central American and Caribbean Games medalists in boxing
Medalists at the 1983 Pan American Games
20th-century Dominican Republic people